Fleina is an island in Gildeskål Municipality in Nordland county, Norway.  The  island lies in the Fleinværfjorden, between the islands of Fugløya and Sørarnøya.  The island of Sandhornøya lies to the east and the mainland lies to the southeast.

See also
List of islands of Norway

References

External links
http://fleina.com/

Gildeskål
Islands of Nordland